VK Novi Beograd is a professional water polo club based in New Belgrade, Serbia. As of 2021–22 season, the club competes in the Serbian League, Regional League A1 and LEN Champions League.

History
The club was founded in 2015. In 2020–21 season, the club made its debut in top-tier Serbian Water Polo League A, where they finished as runners-up. Also, they made the semi-finals of the Serbian Water Polo Cup. In second-tier European competition LEN Euro Cup, Novi Beograd made it to the eight-finals. 

In 2021–22 season, the club significantly improved its roster, and made debut in the Regional League and LEN Champions League. Also, Novi Beograd was named as host of LEN Champions League final tournament from 2021 to 2023. After coming up short in the Serbian Water Polo Cup, losing to VK Radnički Kragujevac in the final game, Novi Beograd eventually won the Regional League in 2021–22 by defeating the VK Jadran Split with 14–11 in the final game, securing their first trophy in history. Duško Pijetlović was named the MVP of the final tournament. It was also only the second trophy for the Serbian clubs in the competition's history. Novi Beograd won the 2021–22 Serbian Water Polo League A as well. Novi Beograd finished their most successful season in club's history by losing in the final of 2021–22 LEN Champions League to Pro Recco on penalties.

Season by season

In European competition
Participations in Champions League: 2x
Participations in Euro Cup: 1x

Honours

Domestic competitions
Regional League
 Winners (1): 2021–22
National Championship
 Winners (1): 2021–22
 Runners-up (1) : 2020–21
National Cup
 Runners-up (1) :  2022

European competitions
LEN Champions League
 Runners-up (1) : 2021–22

References

External links
 
 

2015 establishments in Serbia
Water polo clubs in Serbia